Wellington West may refer to:

 Wellington West (electoral district), a former electoral district Ontario, Canada
 Wellington Street West, a road west of downtown Ottawa, Ontario
 Wellington West (New Zealand electorate), a former electorate in New Zealand
 Wellington West Coast Regiment, a Territorial Force unit of the New Zealand Army
 Wellington West Coast and Taranaki Regiment, a Territorial Force unit of the New Zealand Army
 Queen Alexandra's 2nd (Wellington West Coast) Mounted Rifles, a mounted regiment of the New Zealand Army